

Fa 

 Samuel Factor b. 1892 first elected in 1930 as Liberal member for Toronto West Centre, Ontario.
 Joseph-Fernand Fafard b. 1882 first elected in 1917 as Laurier Liberal member for L'Islet, Quebec.
 Meili Faille b. 1972 first elected in 2004 as Bloc Québécois member for Vaudreuil—Soulanges, Quebec.
 Robert Fair b. 1891 first elected in 1935 as Social Credit member for Battle River, Alberta.
 Charles Fairbairn b. 1837 first elected in 1890 as Liberal-Conservative member for Victoria South, Ontario.
 John Henry Fairbank b. 1831 first elected in 1882 as Liberal member for Lambton East, Ontario.
 Ellen Fairclough b. 1905 first elected in 1950 as Progressive Conservative member for Hamilton West, Ontario.
 Francis Fairey b. 1887 first elected in 1953 as Liberal member for Victoria, British Columbia.
 George Clark Fairfield b. 1912 first elected in 1957 as Progressive Conservative member for Portage—Neepawa, Manitoba.
 Gordon Fairweather b. 1923   first elected in 1962 as Progressive Conservative member for Royal, New Brunswick.
 Rosemarie Falk b. 1988 first elected in 2017 as Conservative member for Battlefords—Lloydminster, Saskatchewan. 
 Ted Falk b. 1960 first elected in 2013 as Conservative member for Provencher, Manitoba. 
 Frank Fane b. 1897   first elected in 1958 as Progressive Conservative member for Vegreville, Alberta.
 Burt Wendell Fansher b. 1880 first elected in 1921 as Progressive member for Lambton East, Ontario.
 William Russell Fansher b. 1876 first elected in 1925 as Progressive member for Last Mountain, Saskatchewan.
 Julian Fantino b. 1942 first elected in 2010 as Conservative member for Vaughan, Ontario. 
 Fonse Faour b. 1951 first elected in 1978 as New Democratic Party member for Humber—St. George's—St. Barbe, Newfoundland and Labrador.
 Thomas Farquhar b. 1875 first elected in 1935 as Liberal member for Algoma East, Ontario.
 Donald Farquharson b. 1834 first elected in 1902 as Liberal member for West Queen's, Prince Edward Island.
 Georges Farrah b. 1957 first elected in 2000 as Liberal member for Bonaventure—Gaspé—Îles-de-la-Madeleine—Pabok, Quebec.
 Thomas Farrow b. 1833 first elected in 1872 as Liberal-Conservative member for Huron North, Ontario.
 Ed Fast b. 1955 first elected in 2006 as Conservative member for Abbotsford, British Columbia. 
 James Hugh Faulkner b. 1933 first elected in 1965 as Liberal member for Peterborough, Ontario.
 Gaspard Fauteux b. 1898 first elected in 1942 as Liberal member for St. Mary, Quebec.
 William LeBoutillier Fauvel b. 1850 first elected in 1891 as Liberal member for Bonaventure, Quebec.
 Guy Favreau b. 1917 first elected in 1963 as Liberal member for Papineau, Quebec.
 Norman Fawcett b. 1910 first elected in 1965 as New Democratic Party member for Nickel Belt, Ontario.

Fe 

 Joseph Featherston b. 1843 first elected in 1891 as Liberal member for Peel, Ontario.
 Douglas Fee b. 1944 first elected in 1988 as Progressive Conservative member for Red Deer, Alberta.
 Louise Feltham b. 1935 first elected in 1988 as Progressive Conservative member for Wild Rose, Alberta.
 Thomas Scott Fennell b. 1928 first elected in 1979 as Progressive Conservative member for Ontario, Ontario.
 Greg Fergus b. 1969 first elected in 2015 as Liberal member for Hull—Aylmer, Quebec.
 Charles Frederick Ferguson first elected in 1874 as Liberal-Conservative member for Leeds North and Grenville North, Ontario.
 Eric Ferguson first elected in 1979 as Progressive Conservative member for Saint John, New Brunswick.
 John Ferguson b. 1839 first elected in 1882 as Conservative member for Welland, Ontario.
 John Ferguson b. 1840 first elected in 1887 as Independent Conservative member for Renfrew South, Ontario.
 Julian Harcourt Ferguson b. 1895 first elected in 1945 as Progressive Conservative member for Simcoe North, Ontario.
 Ralph Ferguson b. 1929 first elected in 1980 as Liberal member for Lambton—Middlesex, Ontario.
 Rork Scott Ferguson b. 1884 first elected in 1935 as Liberal member for Hastings—Peterborough, Ontario.
 Thomas Roberts Ferguson b. 1818 first elected in 1867 as Conservative member for Cardwell, Ontario.
 Charles-Édouard Ferland b. 1892 first elected in 1928 as Liberal member for Joliette, Quebec.
 Marc Ferland b. 1942 first elected in 1984 as Progressive Conservative member for Portneuf, Quebec.
 Michelle Ferreri first elected in 2021 as Conservative member for Peterborough—Kawartha, Ontario.
 Gladstone Mansfield Ferrie b. 1892 first elected in 1949 as Liberal member for Mackenzie, Saskatchewan.
 John Ferris b. 1811 first elected in 1867 as Liberal member for Queen's, New Brunswick.
 J. Émile Ferron b. 1896 first elected in 1935 as Liberal member for Berthier—Maskinongé, Quebec.
 Ron Fewchuk b. 1941 first elected in 1993 as Liberal member for Selkirk—Red River, Manitoba.

Fi 

 William Stevens Fielding b. 1848 first elected in 1896 as Liberal member for Shelburne and Queen's, Nova Scotia.
 Gilbert Fillion b. 1940   first elected in 1993 as Bloc Québécois member for Chicoutimi, Quebec.
 Andy Fillmore b. 1966 first elected in 2015 as Liberal member for Halifax, Nova Scotia.
 James Findlay b. 1833 first elected in 1872 as Liberal member for Renfrew North, Ontario.
 John Walter Findlay b. 1866 first elected in 1921 as Progressive member for Bruce South, Ontario.
 Kerry-Lynne Findlay b. 1955 first elected in 2011 as Conservative member for Delta—Richmond East, British Columbia. 
 Sheila Finestone b. 1927   first elected in 1984 as Liberal member for Mount Royal, Quebec.
 John Finlay b. 1837 first elected in 1904 as Liberal member for Peterborough East, Ontario.
 John Baird Finlay b. 1929   first elected in 1993 as Liberal member for Oxford, Ontario.
 Duncan Finlayson b. 1867 first elected in 1904 as Liberal member for Richmond, Nova Scotia.
 Albert Ernest Finley b. 1870 first elected in 1917 as Unionist member for Souris, Manitoba.
 Diane Finley b. 1957   first elected in 2004 as Conservative member for Haldimand—Norfolk, Ontario.
 Robert Emmett Finn b. 1877   first elected in 1922 as Liberal member for Halifax, Nova Scotia.
 Pat Finnigan b. 1955 first elected in 2015 as Liberal member for Miramichi—Grand Lake, New Brunswick. 
 Walter Firth b. 1935 first elected in 1972 as New Democratic Party member for Northwest Territories, Northwest Territories.
 Eugène Fiset b. 1874 first elected in 1924 as Liberal member for Rimouski, Quebec.
 Jean-Baptiste Romuald Fiset b. 1843 first elected in 1872 as Liberal member for Rimouski, Quebec.
 Albert Fish first elected in 1979 as Progressive Conservative member for Guelph, Ontario.
 Charles Elijah Fish b. 1857 first elected in 1925 as Conservative member for Northumberland, New Brunswick.
 Charles Fisher b. 1808 first elected in 1867 as Liberal member for York, New Brunswick.
 Darren Fisher b. 1965 first elected in 2015 as Liberal member for Dartmouth—Cole Harbour, Nova Scotia. 
 Douglas Glenn Fisher b. 1942 first elected in 1980 as Liberal member for Mississauga North, Ontario.
 Douglas Mason Fisher b. 1919 first elected in 1957 as CCF member for Port Arthur, Ontario.
 John Henry Fisher b. 1855 first elected in 1911 as Conservative member for Brant, Ontario.
 Ron Fisher b. 1934 first elected in 1988 as New Democratic Party member for Saskatoon—Dundurn, Saskatchewan.
 Sydney Arthur Fisher b. 1850 first elected in 1882 as Liberal member for Brome, Quebec.
 Brian Fitzpatrick b. 1945   first elected in 2000 as Canadian Alliance member for Prince Albert, Saskatchewan.
 Charles Fitzpatrick b. 1851 first elected in 1896 as Liberal member for Quebec County, Quebec.
 William Fitzsimmons b. 1818 first elected in 1878 as Conservative member for Brockville, Ontario.

Fl 
 Jim Flaherty b. 1949 first elected in 2006 as Conservative member for Whitby—Oshawa, Ontario. 
 Donald Methuen Fleming b. 1905   first elected in 1945 as Progressive Conservative member for Eglinton, Ontario.
 Gavin Fleming b. 1826 first elected in 1872 as Liberal member for Brant North, Ontario.
 Harry Raymond Fleming b. 1894   first elected in 1935 as Liberal member for Humboldt, Saskatchewan.
 James Fleming b. 1839 first elected in 1882 as Liberal member for Peel, Ontario.
 James Sydney Clark Fleming b. 1939 first elected in 1972 as Liberal member for York West, Ontario.
 Stuart A. Fleming b. 1920 first elected in 1958 as Progressive Conservative member for Okanagan—Revelstoke, British Columbia.
 Hugh John Flemming b. 1899 first elected in 1960 as Progressive Conservative member for Royal, New Brunswick.
 James Kidd Flemming b. 1868 first elected in 1925 as Conservative member for Victoria—Carleton, New Brunswick.
 William Kingston Flesher b. 1825 first elected in 1872 as Conservative member for Grey East, Ontario.
 Steven Fletcher b. 1972 first elected in 2004 as Conservative member for Charleswood—St. James, Manitoba.
 Thomas Barnard Flint b. 1847 first elected in 1891 as Liberal member for Yarmouth, Nova Scotia.
 Jesse Flis b. 1933 first elected in 1979 as Liberal member for Parkdale—High Park, Ontario.
 Edmund Power Flynn b. 1828 first elected in 1874 as Liberal member for Richmond, Nova Scotia.
 Jacques Flynn b. 1915 first elected in 1958 as Progressive Conservative member for Quebec South, Quebec.
 Patrick Flynn b. 1921 first elected in 1974 as Liberal member for Kitchener, Ontario.

Fo 

 Raymonde Folco b. 1940 first elected in 1997 as Liberal member for Laval West, Quebec.
 Frank Sidney Follwell b. 1910 first elected in 1949 as Liberal member for Hastings South, Ontario.
 Peter Fonseca b. 1966 first elected in 2015 as Liberal member for Mississauga East—Cooksville, Ontario.
 Gabriel Fontaine b. 1940 first elected in 1984 as Progressive Conservative member for Lévis, Quebec.
 Joseph Louis Rosario Fontaine b. 1900   first elected in 1945 as Liberal member for St. Hyacinthe—Bagot, Quebec.
 Joseph-Éloi Fontaine b. 1865 first elected in 1917 as Laurier Liberal member for Hull, Quebec.
 Joseph-Théophile-Adélard Fontaine b. 1891   first elected in 1930 as Liberal member for St. Hyacinthe—Rouville, Quebec.
 Joseph Frank Fontana b. 1950   first elected in 1988 as Liberal member for London East, Ontario.
 Judy Foote b. 1952 first elected in 2008 as Liberal member for Random—Burin—St. George's, Newfoundland and Labrador.
 Francis Gordon Forbes b. 1857 first elected in 1891 as Liberal member for Queens, Nova Scotia.
 James Fraser Forbes b. 1820 first elected in 1867 as Anti-Confederate member for Queens, Nova Scotia.
 Richard Elmer Forbes b. 1894   first elected in 1958 as Progressive Conservative member for Dauphin, Manitoba.
 Yves Forest b. 1921   first elected in 1963 as Liberal member for Stanstead, Quebec.
 Joseph David Rodolphe Forget b. 1861 first elected in 1904 as Conservative member for Charlevoix, Quebec.
 Victor Forget first elected in 1968 as Liberal member for Saint-Michel, Quebec.
 James Moffat Forgie b. 1889   first elected in 1953 as Liberal member for Renfrew North, Ontario.
 Robert Forke b. 1860 first elected in 1921 as Progressive member for Brandon, Manitoba.
 Michael Forrestall b. 1932   first elected in 1965 as Progressive Conservative member for Halifax, Nova Scotia.
 William Forrester b. 1855 first elected in 1921 as Liberal member for Perth South, Ontario.
 Paul Forseth b. 1946 first elected in 1993 as Reform member for New Westminster—Burnaby, British Columbia.
 Edmond Fortier b. 1849 first elected in 1900 as Liberal member for Lotbinière, Quebec.
 Hyacinthe-Adélard Fortier b. 1875 first elected in 1917 as Laurier Liberal member for Labelle, Quebec.
 Moïse Fortier b. 1815 first elected in 1867 as Liberal member for Yamaska, Quebec.
 Mona Fortier first elected in 2017 as Liberal member for Ottawa—Vanier, Ontario.
 André-Gilles Fortin b. 1943   first elected in 1968 as Ralliement Créditiste member for Lotbinière, Quebec.
 Émile Fortin b. 1878   first elected in 1930 as Conservative member for Lévis, Quebec.
 Jean-François Fortin b. 1973 first elected in 2011 as New Democratic Party member for Haute-Gaspésie—La Mitis—Matane—Matapédia, Quebec. 
 Louis Fortin b. 1920 first elected in 1958 as Progressive Conservative member for Montmagny—l'Islet, Quebec.
 Pierre Fortin b. 1823 first elected in 1867 as Conservative member for Gaspé, Quebec.
 Rhéal Fortin first elected in 2015 as Bloc Québécois member for Rivière-du-Nord, Quebec
 Thomas Fortin b. 1853 first elected in 1896 as Liberal member for Laval, Quebec.
 Albion Roudolph Foster b. 1875 first elected in 1927 as Liberal member for Victoria—Carleton, New Brunswick.
 Arthur de Witt Foster b. 1886 first elected in 1911 as Conservative member for Kings, Nova Scotia.
 George Eulas Foster b. 1847 first elected in 1882 as Conservative member for King's, New Brunswick.
 Maurice Brydon Foster b. 1933 first elected in 1968 as Liberal member for Algoma, Ontario.
 Thomas Foster b. 1852 first elected in 1917 as Unionist member for York East, Ontario.
 Alphonse Fournier b. 1893   first elected in 1930 as Liberal member for Hull, Quebec.
 Charles Alphonse Fournier b. 1871 first elected in 1917 as Laurier Liberal member for Bellechasse, Quebec.
 Edgar E. Fournier b. 1908 first elected in 1961 as Progressive Conservative member for Restigouche—Madawaska, New Brunswick.
 Ghislain Fournier b. 1938 first elected in 1997 as Bloc Québécois member for Manicouagan, Quebec.
 Sarto Fournier b. 1903 first elected in 1935 as Liberal member for Maisonneuve—Rosemont, Quebec.
 Télesphore Fournier b. 1823 first elected in 1870 as Liberal member for Bellechasse, Quebec.
 Frederick Luther Fowke b. 1857 first elected in 1908 as Liberal member for Ontario South, Ontario.
 George William Fowler b. 1859 first elected in 1900 as Conservative member for King's, New Brunswick.
 Francis Fox b. 1939 first elected in 1972 as Liberal member for Argenteuil—Deux-Montagnes, Quebec.
 Walter Frank Foy b. 1908 first elected in 1962 as Liberal member for Lambton West, Ontario.

Fr 
 Peter Fragiskatos b. 1981 first elected in 2015 as Liberal member for London North Centre, Ontario.
 Sidney Arthur Fraleigh b. 1931 first elected in 1979 as Progressive Conservative member for Lambton—Middlesex, Ontario.
 Cyril Lloyd Francis b. 1920 first elected in 1963 as Liberal member for Carleton, Ontario.
 Joseph Napoléon Francoeur b. 1880 first elected in 1937 as Liberal member for Lotbinière, Quebec.
 William Charles Frank b. 1923 first elected in 1972 as Progressive Conservative member for Middlesex, Ontario.
 Allan MacPherson Fraser b. 1906 first elected in 1953 as Liberal member for St. John's East, Newfoundland and Labrador.
 Austin Levi Fraser b. 1868 first elected in 1908 as Conservative member for King's, Prince Edward Island.
 Colin Fraser b. 1978 first elected in 2015 as Liberal member for West Nova, Nova Scotia. 
 Duncan Cameron Fraser b. 1845 first elected in 1891 as Liberal member for Guysborough, Nova Scotia.
 Evan Eugene Fraser b. 1865 first elected in 1917 as Unionist member for Welland, Ontario.
 Gordon Knapman Fraser b. 1891   first elected in 1940 as National Government member for Peterborough West, Ontario.
 James Harshaw Fraser b. 1841 first elected in 1875 as Liberal-Conservative member for London, Ontario.
 John Fraser b. 1849 first elected in 1896 as Liberal member for Lambton East, Ontario.
 John Allen Fraser b. 1931 first elected in 1972 as Progressive Conservative member for Vancouver South, British Columbia.
 John Anderson Fraser b. 1866 first elected in 1925 as Conservative member for Cariboo, British Columbia.
 Sean Fraser b. 1984 first elected in 2015 as Liberal member for Central Nova, Nova Scotia. 
 William Alexander Fraser (politician) b. 1886   first elected in 1930 as Liberal member for Northumberland, Ontario.
 John L. Frazer b. 1931   first elected in 1993 as Reform member for Saanich—Gulf Islands, British Columbia.
 Antoine Fréchette b. 1905   first elected in 1958 as Progressive Conservative member for Témiscouata, Quebec.
 Louis Honoré Fréchette b. 1839 first elected in 1874 as Liberal member for Lévis, Quebec.
 Louis-Israël Côté alias Fréchette b. 1848 first elected in 1882 as Conservative member for Mégantic, Quebec.
 Chrystia Freeland b. 1968 first elected in 2013 as Liberal member for Toronto Centre, Ontario. 
 Carole Freeman b. 1949 first elected in 2006 as Bloc Québécois member for Châteauguay—Saint-Constant, Quebec. 
 Joshua Newton Freeman b. 1816 first elected in 1887 as Liberal-Conservative member for Queens, Nova Scotia.
 Mylène Freeman b. 1989 first elected in 2011 as New Democratic Party member for Argenteuil—Papineau—Mirabel, Quebec. 
 Jules Joseph Taschereau Frémont b. 1855 first elected in 1891 as Liberal member for Quebec County, Quebec.
 Jean-Louis Frenette b. 1920 first elected in 1962 as Social Credit member for Portneuf, Quebec.
 Claude Girven Fretz b. 1927 first elected in 1979 as Progressive Conservative member for Erie, Ontario.
 Benno Friesen b. 1929 first elected in 1974 as Progressive Conservative member for Surrey—White Rock, British Columbia.
 Alfred Ernest Fripp b. 1866 first elected in 1911 as Conservative member for City of Ottawa, Ontario.
 Douglas Cockburn Frith b. 1945 first elected in 1980 as Liberal member for Sudbury, Ontario.
 Jake Froese b. 1925 first elected in 1979 as Progressive Conservative member for Niagara Falls, Ontario.
 Francis Theodore Frost b. 1843 first elected in 1896 as Liberal member for Leeds North and Grenville North, Ontario.
 Liza Frulla b. 1949 first elected in 2002 as Liberal member for Verdun—Saint-Henri—Saint-Paul—Pointe Saint-Charles, Quebec.
 Hedy Fry b. 1941 first elected in 1993 as Liberal member for Vancouver Centre, British Columbia.

Fu 
 Stephen Fuhr b. 1969 first elected in 2015 as Liberal member for Kelowna—Lake Country, British Columbia. 
 George Taylor Fulford b. 1902 first elected in 1940 as Liberal member for Leeds, Ontario.
 Edmund Davie Fulton b. 1916 first elected in 1945 as Progressive Conservative member for Kamloops, British Columbia.
 Frederick John Fulton b. 1862 first elected in 1917 as Unionist member for Cariboo, British Columbia.
 James Ross Fulton b. 1950 first elected in 1979 as New Democratic Party member for Skeena, British Columbia.
 Oscar Fulton b. 1843 first elected in 1878 as Liberal-Conservative member for Stormont, Ontario.
 Ray Funk b. 1948 first elected in 1988 as New Democratic Party member for Prince Albert—Churchill River, Saskatchewan.
 Stephen Joseph Furniss b. 1875 first elected in 1935 as Liberal member for Muskoka—Ontario, Ontario.

F